The Audubon Plantation is a Southern plantation with a historic mansion located at 21371 Hoo Shoo Too Road, Baton Rouge, Louisiana.

The house was completed in c.1850 but origins of Audubon plantation remains quite obscure. A reference to Audubon can be found in the Statement of the Sugar Crop for  1892. At that time the plantation owner was Octavius Bullion, while the mansion was rented to Dixon family.

The house was listed on the National Register of Historic Places on May 14, 1987.

See also
National Register of Historic Places listings in East Baton Rouge Parish, Louisiana

References

External links

African-American history in Baton Rouge, Louisiana
Plantation houses in Louisiana
Houses completed in 1850
Houses in East Baton Rouge Parish, Louisiana
Antebellum architecture
Houses on the National Register of Historic Places in Louisiana
National Register of Historic Places in Baton Rouge, Louisiana